SKA Rostov-on-Don was a Russian women's association football club based in Rostov-on-Don. Founded in 2006 as part of the male football club FC SKVO Rostov-on-Don, they folded in 2008 after finishing third in the Russian Women's Football Championship. Owner Ivan Savvidis could no longer fund the team due to the global economic downturn.

References

Association football clubs established in 2006
Association football clubs disestablished in 2008
Defunct football clubs in Russia
Women's football clubs in Russia
Sport in Rostov-on-Don
2006 establishments in Russia
2008 disestablishments in Russia
Women